The ALCO DL420 was the prototype ALCO S-5 switcher diesel-electric locomotive.

It rode on two-axle trucks with a B-B wheel arrangement, and was the first ALCO switcher with a front radiator opening. This one-of-a-kind unit spent its time at the Niskayuna test facility, then at Schenectady as a shop switcher (#6). It was scrapped in the late 1950s.

See also 
 List of ALCO diesel locomotives
 List of MLW diesel locomotives

References 
 Data from The American Locomotive Company A Centennial Remembrance by Richard Steinbrenner pp. 311-312 photo, 340 photo, 394 photos
 Rolf Stumpf's ALCO World website switcher specification page

B-B locomotives
DL420
Experimental locomotives
Diesel-electric locomotives of the United States
Railway locomotives introduced in 1951
Standard gauge locomotives of the United States
Scrapped locomotives
Unique locomotives
Individual locomotives of the United States